Gecode (for Generic Constraint Development Environment) is a software library for solving Constraint satisfaction problems. It is programmed in C++ and distributed as free software under the permissive MIT license. Gecode has bindings for several programming languages such as Prolog, Python and Ruby, and an interface to the AMPL modeling language.

The development of Gecode has been led by Christian Schulte, but has been contributed to by many other researchers and programmers, including 
Denys Duchier, 
Filip Konvicka, 
Gabor Szokoli, 
Guido Tack, 
Håkan Kjellerstrand, 
Mikael Lagerkvist, 
Patrick Pekczynski, 
Raphael Reischuk, and 
Tias Guns.

The first release of Gecode was in December 2005.   Since then, Gecode has rapidly become one of the most prominent constraint programming systems.
Reasons for this are that it runs fast, is extensible, free and open source under a permissive licence, and is written in a popular language.    As well as being very useful in its own right, its extensibility and licensing makes it highly suitable for use on other projects. Gecode has been ported to several language, for instance, Gelisp is a wrapper of Gecode for Lisp.

Notes

References 
 Speeding up constraint propagation. Christian Schulte and Peter J. Stuckey, In Wallace, 2004, pages 619–633.
 Compiling and Executing Declarative Modeling Languages to Gecode. Raffaele Cipriano, Agostino Dovier, Jacopo Mauro. Conference: International Conference on Logic Programming/Joint International Conference and Symposium on Logic Programming - ICLP(JICSLP), pp. 744–748, 2008
 Monadic Constraint Programming with Gecode. Pieter Wuille, Tom Schrijvers. Proceedings of the 8th International Workshop on Constraint Modelling and Reformulation pages:171-185. International workshop on Constraint Modelling and Reformulation. Lisbon, 20 September 2009.
 A hybrid solver for large neighborhood search: Mixing Gecode and EasyLocal++. Raffaele Cipriano, Luca Di Gaspero, Agostino Dovier. Conference: Hybrid Metaheuristics - HM, pp. 141–155, 2009. DOI: 10.1007/978-3-642-04918-7_11

External links 
Gecode home site
Christian Schulte , lead developer of Gecode.
Constraint Propagation  - Dissertation by Guido Tack explaining the theory and implementation of Gecode

Constraint programming
Software using the MIT license